Tipula maxima is a species of true cranefly.

Distribution
Tipula maxima is widespread throughout the western Palaearctic.

References

External links
BioLib

Tipulidae
Diptera of Europe
Insects described in 1761
Taxa named by Nikolaus Poda von Neuhaus